Košarkaški klub Jazine Arbanasi, also known as KK Jazine Arbanasi or simply Jazine Arbanasi, is a men's professional basketball club based in Zadar, Croatia. It competes in the second-tier First League.

The club plays home matches in the Jazine Basketball Hall, sometimes in the Krešimir Ćosić Hall. The club competed for a number of years in the First Men's Basketball League, but for the 2016–17 season it was promoted to the top HT Premijer liga.

Since September, 2020, the club is officially the development team of KK Zadar.

Notable players  
 Pankracije Barać
 Teo Petani
 Juraj Segarić

Honours 
Domestic league
 A-2 Liga: 2016–17

References

Basketball teams in Croatia